The list of mountains of East Antarctica includes the highest mountains in East Antarctica.

See also 

 List of mountains of Queen Maud Land
 List of mountains of Enderby Land
 List of mountains of Mac. Robertson Land
 List of mountains of Princess Elizabeth Land
 List of mountains of Wilkes Land

References

External links 
 
 "Antarctica Ultra-Prominences". Peaklist.org

Australian Antarctic Territory
East Antarctica
 
Mountains of East Antarctica, List